William Howard Nelson (born March 9, 1948) is a former American football defensive tackle in the National Football League (NFL) who played for the Los Angeles Rams. He played college football at Oregon State University.

References 

1948 births
Living people
Players of American football from Berkeley, California
American football defensive tackles
Oregon State Beavers football players
Los Angeles Rams players